The Curtis L. Carlson School of Management is the business school of the University of Minnesota, a public research university in the Twin Cities of Minneapolis and Saint Paul, Minnesota. The Carlson School offers undergraduate and graduate degrees as well as an executive education program. The Carlson School also offers dual degrees with the colleges and schools of public affairs, law, medicine, and public health.

History 
The Carlson School of Management was founded in 1919 in response to requests from business people in the Twin Cities to establish a business school at the University of Minnesota. From the beginning, members of the business community worked in partnership with the school's faculty and students by providing classroom speakers, internships, employment opportunities, and scholarships. In that first year, 14 faculty members instructed 88 students. Since then, the school has undergone five name changes and has been housed in five locations.
Today, the Carlson School has nearly 5,000 students, 55,000 alumni, twelve degree programs, 103 tenure-track and 39 full-time instructional faculty members.

Campus 
The Carlson School of Management's two facilities, the Curtis L. Carlson School of Management and Herbert M. Hanson Jr. Hall are located on the University of Minnesota's West Bank, west of the Mississippi River.

Curtis L. Carlson School of Management 
The building encompasses 33 classrooms, 35 meeting rooms, a 180-seat lecture hall, and a 250-seat auditorium. The facility is equipped with wireless internet access, experiential learning laboratories, teleconferencing and video interview capabilities. It is also home to a dining center located in the basement level of the building. The facility is currently undergoing renovations.

Herbert M. Hanson Jr. Hall 
Opened on September 25, 2008, Hanson Hall is connected to the Carlson School by the Robert Sparboe skyway. As part of a $40 million expansion project, Herbert M. Hanson Jr. Hall nearly doubled the size of the business school, and provided a state-of-the-art home for the Carlson School Undergraduate program. The facility also features 22 interview rooms, 10 breakout rooms, a collaborative learning lab, a recruiter lounge, a meeting room for information sessions and presentations by the corporate community, offices for undergraduate advising, undergraduate career placement, offices for the Department of Economics in the College of Liberal Arts, and a Caribou Coffee. The building is named after the generous benefactors, Herb ’49 B.A. and Bar Hanson, who kicked off the building campaign with a $10 million pledge in 2004. In spring 2006, the Minnesota State Legislature granted $26.6 million in funding to the Carlson School as part of the University of Minnesota's Capital Campaign request.

Academics 

The school offers a bachelor's, MBA, and doctoral degrees, as well as executive education programs hosted domestically and abroad (Warsaw, China, Vienna). Dual-degree programs include a JD/MBA, MD/MBA, MHA/MBA, and a MPP/MBA. Other programs include a Master of Arts in Human Resources and Industrial Relations (MA-HRIR), a  Master of Business Taxation (MBT), and a Master of Accountancy (MAcc).

In 1920, the University of Minnesota became the 18th school to be accredited by the Association to Advance Collegiate Schools of Business (AACSB).

In the 2017 CEOWORLD magazine ranking of the top 50 American college for an accounting degree, Carlson School of Management, ranked 2 just behind BYU School of Accountancy.

Notable alumni 

Curtis L. Carlson ('37 BA) – Chairman, Carlson Companies, Inc., namesake of the Curtis L. Carlson School of Management
 Evan Kaufmann (born 1984), hockey player
John G. Stumpf (MBA) – Former CEO, Wells Fargo
Thomas O. Staggs (BSB) – Former COO, The Walt Disney Company
C. Elmer Anderson ('31 BBA, '83 PhD) – Minnesota Governor, Minnesota State Senator; Chair & CEO, HB Fuller Co.
Richard Cyert ('43 BSB) – President, Carnegie Mellon University
Robert K. Jaedicke ('57 PhD) – Dean & Professor Emeritus, Stanford Graduate School of Business
Marcus Alexis ('59 PhD) – Dean, University of Illinois at Chicago, College of Business Administration
Tony Dungy ('78 BSB) – Former Head Coach, Indianapolis Colts, National Football League
John Hammergren ('81 BSB) – Chairman & CEO, McKesson Corporation
Flip Saunders ('83 BSB) – Co-owner, President of Basketball Operations & General Manager, Minnesota Timberwolves, National Basketball Association; Former Head Coach, Minnesota Timberwolves, National Basketball Association
Wan Ling Martello ('83 MBA) – Executive Vice President, Chief Executive Officer Zone Asia, Oceania and sub-Saharan Africa, Nestlé; Former Executive Vice President, Global eCommerce, Emerging Markets, Walmart

See also 
List of United States business school rankings
List of business schools in the United States

References

External links 
Official website

Business schools in Minnesota
University of Minnesota
Educational institutions established in 1919
1919 establishments in Minnesota